Walter Edward Easley (September 8, 1957 – February 14, 2013) was a fullback in the NFL and USFL.

He played his college football for the West Virginia Mountaineers, running for 1,773 yards and 19 touchdowns.  In the NFL, he played two years for the San Francisco 49ers and was a member of the Super Bowl XVI championship team.  With the 49ers, he rushed for 235 yards on 81 carries and caught nine passes for 62 yards.  He later played for the Chicago Blitz and Pittsburgh Maulers in the USFL.

References

External links
Just Sports Stats

1957 births
2013 deaths
West Virginia Mountaineers football players
American football fullbacks
San Francisco 49ers players
Chicago Blitz players
Sportspeople from Charleston, West Virginia
Pittsburgh Maulers players
Players of American football from West Virginia